Loxophlebia roseipectus is a moth of the subfamily Arctiinae. It was described by Rothschild in 1931. It is found in Brazil.

References

 Natural History Museum Lepidoptera generic names catalog

Loxophlebia
Moths described in 1931